The 2005 Canada Masters (also known as the 2005 Rogers Masters and 2005 Rogers Cup for sponsorship reasons) was a tennis tournament played on outdoor hard courts. It was the 116th edition of the Canada Masters, and was part of the ATP Masters Series of the 2005 ATP Tour, and of the Tier I Series of the 2005 WTA Tour. The men's event took place at the Uniprix Stadium in Montreal, Quebec, Canada, from August 8 through August 14, 2005, and the women's event at the Rexall Centre in Toronto, Ontario, Canada, from August 15 through August 21, 2005.

The men's field was led by ATP No. 2 and French Open champion Rafael Nadal, Australian Open and Indian Wells finalist Lleyton Hewitt, and Wimbledon runner-up and Washington winner Andy Roddick. Among other seeds were former World No. 1 and recent Los Angeles champion Andre Agassi, Pörtschach titlist Nikolay Davydenko, Gastón Gaudio, Guillermo Coria and Mariano Puerta.

The women's draw featured WTA No. 2 and Rome winner Amélie Mauresmo, Warsaw runner-up Svetlana Kuznetsova, and Roland-Garros champion Justine Henin-Hardenne. Other top seeds were Australian Open champion Serena Williams, Berlin finalist Nadia Petrova, Kim Clijsters, Anastasia Myskina and Nathalie Dechy.

Finals

Men's singles

 Rafael Nadal defeated  Andre Agassi, 6–3, 4–6, 6–2
It was Rafael Nadal's 9th title of the year, and his 10th overall. It was his 3rd Masters title of the year, and overall.

Women's singles

 Kim Clijsters defeated  Justine Henin-Hardenne, 7–5, 6–1
It was Kim Clijsters's 6th title of the year, and her 27th overall. It was her 3rd Tier I title of the year, and her 5th overall.

Men's doubles

 Wayne Black /  Kevin Ullyett defeated  Jonathan Erlich /  Andy Ram, 6–7(5–7), 6–3, 6–0

Women's doubles

 Anna-Lena Grönefeld /  Martina Navratilova defeated  Conchita Martínez /  Virginia Ruano Pascual, 5–7, 6–3, 6–4

References

External links
Official website
Men's Singles draw
Men's Doubles draw
Men's Qualifying Singles draw
Women's Singles, Doubles, Qualifying Singles and Qualifying Doubles draws

 
Rogers Cup
Rogers Cup
Canadian Open (tennis)
Rogers Cup
Rogers Cup